Love child may refer to:

 Love child, a euphemism for a child born out of wedlock; see Legitimacy (family law)

Film
 Love Child (1982 film), a film based on a true story, starring Beau Bridges and Amy Madigan
 Love Child (2011 film), a Dominican Republic film
 Love Child (2014 film), a South Korean-American documentary film

Music

Performers
 Lovechild (band), a Northern Ireland indie rock band
 Love Child (band), an American alternative rock band
 Q-Tip (musician), formerly MC Love Child, American rapper

Albums
 Love Child (The Supremes album) or the title song (see below), 1968
 Love Child (Sweet Sensation album), 1990
 Lovechild (album) or the title song, by Curved Air, 1990
 Love Child (Ella Riot EP), 2011

Songs
 "Love Child" (song), by Diana Ross & the Supremes, 1968
 "Love Child" (Goodbye Mr. Mackenzie song), 1990
 "Love Child", by Accept from Balls to the Wall, 1984
 "Love Child", by Arrows, 1976
 "Love Child", by Deep Purple from Come Taste the Band, 1975
 "Love Child", by Swing Out Sister from Get in Touch with Yourself, 1992
 "Lovechild", by Talisman from  Genesis, 1993

Other media
 Love Child (TV series), a 2014–2017 Australian drama series
 Love Child, a 1986 novel by Andrew Neiderman